Isnav is a little village from one of the 22 Gam Patidar Samaj, situated at coordinates: 22°31'59"N | 72°45'51"E just nearby small town called Sojitra. Isnav is surrounded by natural countryside. The village has an entrance from the State Highway 83 (Anand – sojitra) in Gujarat. From the Gateway, off the highway just after 0.80 km drive is the village Isnav.

The village has a famous temple of legendary goddess “Shree Fulbai Maa” just on the side of a lake in the entrance. Also there is a temple of the ancient Goddess “Shree Vehrai Maa” as she is the Country Mother for all the resident and citizens of the Isnav village. Further You can find BAPS Swaminarayan Mandir. Village also has a Primary school for the better education for the children's from Isnav and other remote areas. There is a Dairy in the middle of the common place of Isnav, as the farming is the common business of the country people. The Village also holds Common Hall called “Isnav Patidar Vaadi”, is for nominal rent for those who wants to celebrate their private functions at their door steps.

People in and from the Isnav village are kind, soft-spoken and religious as there are number of other temples in village. Village also holds big functions on number of festivals throughout the year and during these time People in isnav village are most often busy in providing Hospitality for their guests. "Isnav Yuvak Mandal” is a group of young teenagers and they are engaged in social activities such as, arranging festival events like Navaratri Garaba, Diwali, Uttarayan, Holi and many more.

Anand District  of the Gujarat State is also known as “Charotar”. Charotar means Land of Golden Crops.

Isnav is one of the 26 villages/ghaams that have formed the 22 Gam Patidar Samaj also known as nani Satyavis (27).

History 

It is said that the village was first located somewhere near Hamnuman Mandir, Harmanpura (One of the sim area of recent Isnav Village). But due to criminal activity such as looting by people called "Lootaras and Vanjaras", people decided to move down to the nearby village of Piplav. They moved next to Piplav so that in case of crimes they could be helped by the villagers of Piplav. From then on the village of Isnav was adjacent to the village of Piplav.

Communities 

Patel is major community in the village
Patel
There are two types of Patels in the village. Leva patel and Kadva Patel.
Prajapati (Kumbhar)
Rajput/Darbar/Thakur/Vaghela
Harijan
Muslim

Economy 
Agriculture and Dairy business plays a large part in the regions prosperity. Agricultural goods primarily consists of Tobacco, Rice, Bajra and Wheat. And approximately 10,000 liters of milk per day is being sold to AMUL Dairy by the villagers.

Landmarks 
Beyond everything. Isnav Village do have Petrol Station (PRAMUKH PETROLEUM) which is Landmark and being working 24 hours since Feb 2015.

Migration 
Lack of education and skills have let down progress of the village, but recently young generation have started migrating to nearby cities including Anand, Petlad and Sojitra for business. Few students have also migrated to Abroad countries like US, UK and Australia for further studies. Few Families have also migrated to Africa for Work and Job. Many Families have permanently migrated abroad (US & UK).

Temples (Mandir) 

Shri Fulbai Mata Temple

The temple of the legendary Goddess "Fulbai Mataji" is being there since the village was formed. The temple was being renovated by the villagers residing in India and Abroad in 2004.
Shri Vehrai Mata Temple

It is also said that the temple of the ancient Goddess "Vehrai Mataji" is being there since the village was formed and it was also renovated in 2006

*Shri Bhidbhanjan Hanuman Temple, Harmanpura

Hanuman temple situated at Harmanpura (one of the sim area of Isnav) is said to be built 700 years ago. Near this temple was the village Isnav. Many people come from nearby villages and towns like Sojitra, Palaj, Piplav, etc. to pray at this temple on Saturdays.
There is a history about the idols of God Ganpatiji and Hanumanji. Due to the Lootaras and Vanjaras, the idols of God Ganpatiji and Hanumanji was being somewhat broken ("Being Kandit") and the hands and legs where broken. So the villagers decided to replace that idols with the newer ones. The day when the "puja" was done to remove the old idols, it rained a lot and there was huge flood in the village. So then the villagers decided not to remove the "Kandit" Idols. So now if one visits there, can find two idols of lord Ganpati and Hanumanji. One which is old enough and broken ("khandit") and other being the recent one.

*Shri BAPS Swaminarayan Temple

BAPS swaminarayan mandir was built in 1992 by the guidance of Param Pujya Pramukh Swami Maharaj, head of BAPS Swaminarayan Santha. Param Pujya Pramukh Swami Maharaj inaugurated this temple in late 1992.
The land was being donated by one of the Haribhakt namely, Late Shri Manibhai Motibhai Patel, father of Mr. Yogendrabhai Manibhai Patel. Years ago that land was being a street of Vagri Vas which was being moved from there to the land offered by late Shri Manibhai Patel to build BAPS Swaminarayan Mandir.
The temple was being renovated in 2008. Now you can find a garden surrounding the temple which is one of the best green area of the whole village.
Neelkanth Mahadev

This temple is situated in the heart of Isnav Village and is also being said to be built since the village was formed. The temple was renovated in 2011 with huge donation from villagers and Isnavis abroad.
Excluding this, There are also few temples in the village namely,
Shri Swaminarayan Mandir (Vadtal Vasi)           This temple is under renovation since Apr 2017
Shri Swaminarayan Mandir (Ladies Only)     
Shree Mahakali Mataji Mandir
Shri Bhatiji Maharaj Mandir
Shri Badiyadev Maharaj Mandir
Shree Vehrai Maa Mandir (Vasanda)(N/r Mahadev Street)
Shri Hanuman Mandir (N/r Bordi Street)
Shree Hadakdevi Maa Mandir (Vagri Vas)

Transport 
By road: Isnav is 4 km from Sojitra and 21 km from Anand.
By rail: Nearest railway station is in Petlad which is 8 km from Isnav.
By air: Nearest airport is in Vadodara which is 62 km from Isnav.

External links 

WikiMapia view of Isnav(Created by Pratik Patel)
Official Website of Isnav Village
Website Isnav Village

Villages in Anand district